Quiche consists of a pastry crust filled with savoury custard and pieces of cheese, meat, seafood or vegetables. 

Quiche or Quiches may also refer to:

 Kʼicheʼ (disambiguation), or Quiché, several uses
 Quiché Department, in Guatemala
 Quiché Airport, Santa Cruz del Quiché
 Quiches District, in Peru
 Quiche, a Tokyo Mew Mew character
 Quiche Lorraine, a minor character in Bloom County comic strip

See also
 Chiché (disambiguation)